Erbendorf is a town  in the Upper Palatinate (Oberpfalz) region of Germany. As of December, 2006, the town has a population of 5,341.

The following villages are incorporated into the town:
Aschenhof, Birkenreuth, Boxdorf, Eppenhof, Frodersreuth, Glashütte, Gössenreuth, Gramlhof, Grötschenreuth, Hauxdorf, Inglashof, Napfberg, Neuenreuth, Pfaben, Plärn, Schadenreuth, Siegritz, Steinbach, Straßenschacht, Thann, Wäldern, Wetzldorf, and Wildenreuth.

Main Attractions of Erbendorf
Hiking and biking in the Stienwald region; a mountain range and a national park well known for its long-distance trails.
The Mining Museum of Erbendorf, as the city has a very rich mining history.
A public recreation center equipped with two heated outdoor pools.
Walking tour of cellars.

Personalities

Sons and daughters of the city

 Hans Müller (1898-1974), politician (SPD), Member of Bundestag 1953-1965
 Wilhelm Schraml (born 1935), 84. Bishop of Passau

Personalities who have worked in the city

 Norbert Scharf (1952-2010), Landtag deputy (SPD), was from 2005 to 2008 member of the town council of Erbendorf

References

External links
Homepage of the City of Erbendorf
Webcam

Tirschenreuth (district)